Daniel David Morrison (November 20, 1931 – March 13, 1993) was a sailor who represented the United States Virgin Islands. He competed in the Tempest event at the 1976 Summer Olympics.

References

External links
 
 

1931 births
1993 deaths
United States Virgin Islands male sailors (sport)
Olympic sailors of the United States Virgin Islands
Sailors at the 1976 Summer Olympics – Tempest
Sportspeople from Sarasota, Florida